Ivan Cleary (born 1 March 1971) is an Australian professional rugby league coach who is the head coach of the Penrith Panthers in the NRL and a former professional rugby league footballer who played as a  and  in the 1990s and 2000s.

He is a former head coach of the Wests Tigers and New Zealand Warriors, as well as the two time NRL Premiership winning head coach of the Penrith Panthers, who led the Panthers to the 2021 premiership in the National Rugby League. As a player, Cleary was a goal-kicking  who played club football in Australia and New Zealand, setting a new record for most points scored in a season during the 1998 NRL Premiership.

Early life
Cleary was born in Sydney, New South Wales, Australia. He grew up in the Sydney Northern Beaches' suburb of Beacon Hill and attended Beacon Hill High School. He is of Croatian Heritage.

Playing career

Manly-Warringah Sea Eagles
Originally a goal-kicking fullback, Cleary was a Manly-Warringah Sea Eagles junior before moving to play Reserve Grade with the Sea Eagles in 1992 and 1993. He started his first grade career with the Manly-Warringah club in 1992 playing two games before getting his chance after the team's first choice fullback Matthew Ridge suffered a season-ending injury in mid-1993. Cleary filled the fullback spot and also proved himself an accurate goal-kicker, filling in for Ridge on both counts and helping Manly to 4th place and a finals berth where they were bundled out 4-16 by the Brisbane Broncos in the Qualifying Final.

In his 15 first grade games for Manly, Cleary scored eight tries and kicked 50 goals (from 71 attempts for 70.4%) for a total of 132 points.

North Sydney Bears
With Ridge set to return in 1994 Cleary signed with Manly's local rivals the North Sydney Bears for 1994 and 1995 seasons where he mainly played in the centres due to the emergence of fullback Matt Seers. He also was the team's second choice goal kicker behind Jason Taylor and in 37 games for the Bears he scored 15 tries but kicked only 5 goals (from 6 attempts) for a total of 70 points.

Sydney Roosters
Cleary began playing for the Sydney City Roosters from the 1996 ARL season through to the 1999 NRL season making 81 appearances for the tri-colours. In 1998, Cleary was the NRL's top point scorer with 284 points.

New Zealand Warriors
Cleary signed with the New Zealand Warriors for the 2000 NRL season before the fullback retired at the end of the 2002 NRL season following the club's 2002 NRL Grand Final loss against the Sydney Roosters.

Coaching career

After leaving the Warriors Cleary originally intended to join the Huddersfield Giants in the Super League but instead retired to take up an opportunity to join the Sydney Roosters as the NSWRL Premier League coach. In 2004 he coached the team to the Premiership.

New Zealand Warriors
Cleary coached New Zealand to the 2011 NRL Grand Final against Manly; they lost 24–10. In the following weeks, Cleary announced he was leaving to join Penrith.

Penrith Panthers
Early season injuries and some poor form from the Penrith Panthers saw a tough start to Cleary's return to Sydney with Penrith sitting 15th after Round 19 of the 2012 NRL season with a 4–13 record. In 2014, Cleary took Penrith to the preliminary final before losing to Canterbury.

He was also named Dally M coach of the year in the same season. He was fired on 19 October 2015 after avoiding the wooden spoon with a final round victory over Newcastle.

Wests Tigers
He was appointed as the coach of the Wests Tigers on 3 April 2017. In Round 22 of the 2017 NRL Season, Cleary coached the Wests Tigers and coached against his son, Nathan Cleary who was playing for the Penrith Panthers in a losing effort by 28–14. 

In the 2018 season, Cleary guided Wests to a ninth-placed finish narrowly missing out on a finals spot. On 11 August 2018 Cleary released a prepared statement ending speculation that he would leave the Wests Tigers to coach Penrith. Cleary said: ""I advised the Panthers of my ongoing contract status with the Wests Tigers....I intend to honour this contract"{{Cite web|url=.  On 28 October 2018, following pressure from Cleary, the Wests Tigers released Cleary from the final two years of his contract.  Cleary also sent a departing text message to the Tigers playing group saying "G'day boys I hope this finds you well and enjoying your time off, I was writing to you in the hope of beating the press.. to let you know that I will no longer be your coach at Wests Tigers. "This is an extremely uncomfortable situation for me as I have genuine fondness for the club, and I have loved coaching you all.. I understand that this situation has caused some pain for people that I care about, along with putting the club in an awkward situation... I do not feel good about this. "I would have preferred to do this in person but time and circumstances have made that impossible. I hope we meet again soon and I wish you all the very best in the future. You have my number and I am always open for a chat if you wish. Iv."

Return to the Penrith Panthers 
On 29 October 2018, the Penrith Panthers confirmed the return of Ivan Cleary as head coach, on a 5-year deal, beginning in 2019. Ivan linked with his son Nathan Cleary and began his second stint as head coach at the Penrith Panthers.

Cleary's second spell in charge at Penrith got off to a bad start with the club winning only 2 of their first 10 matches leaving the team bottom of the table.  Penrith would then go on to win their next 7 games in a row leaving them just outside the finals places.  In a must win game against the Sydney Roosters in round 24, Penrith lost the match 22–6 at the Sydney Cricket Ground which meant that the club would miss out on the finals series for the first time since 2015.

In round 8 of the 2020 NRL season, Cleary coached Penrith to a 19–12 victory over the Wests Tigers.  Following the full time siren, angry Wests fans shouted abuse at Cleary who was inside the coaches box.  Cleary proceeded to wave and blow kisses at the Wests Tigers supporters.

Following Penrith's 28-12 round 13 victory over Canberra in the 2020 NRL season, Cleary questioned the integrity of the referees in the post match press conference by saying he felt Canberra were managed back into the game by the officials.  Cleary was later fined $20,000 for his comments.

In round 19 of the 2020 NRL season, Cleary guided Penrith to victory over North Queensland 32–12 at the Queensland Country Bank Stadium.  The win was Penrith's 14th in a row and also meant they had claimed the 2020 Minor Premiership, only the third time Penrith had done this in their history.
On 19 October, four years since being sacked as being head coach of the Panthers,
Cleary was named Dally M Coach of the Year for the second time for his efforts of Penrith's 2020 season.

Cleary guided Penrith to the 2020 NRL Grand Final on the back of a 17-game unbeaten streak. In the final, Penrith's opponents were Melbourne who raced out to a 22–0 lead.  Penrith fought their way back into the game during the second half but lost the grand final 26–20.

In 2021, Cleary guided the Penrith club to a comfortable 2nd place, on 44 points. This placing them in the qualifying final against South Sydney, in which Penrith were defeated pushing them back into a knock out final the next week. After defeating both the Parramatta Eels and the Melbourne Storm, Penrith qualified for the 2021 NRL Grand Final being held at Suncorp Stadium on 3 October 2021. The Penrith club, with the guidance of Cleary, won the NRL Grand Final against South Sydney, 14–12. This made Cleary a premiership winning coach for the first time after coaching over 370 NRL games.

In 2022, Cleary won his second NRL Premiership in a row as coach of Penrith when he guided his side to a 28–12 win over the Parramatta Eels in what was considered by many experts to be one of the best all round performances from a NRL side in a Grand Final.

Statistics

Coaching Honours
Penrith Panthers
NRL Premiership: 2021, 2022

Individual
Dally M Coach of the Year: 2014, 2020

References

External links
Penrith Panthers profile
Wests Tigers profile
Profile, yesterdayshero.com.au
Profile, rugbyleague.co.nz

 

1971 births
Living people
Australian people of Croatian descent
Australian rugby league coaches
Australian rugby league players
Lebanon national rugby league team coaches
Manly Warringah Sea Eagles players
New Zealand Warriors captains
New Zealand Warriors coaches
New Zealand Warriors players
North Sydney Bears players
Penrith Panthers coaches
Rugby league centres
Rugby league fullbacks
Rugby league players from Sydney
Sydney Roosters players